Peter Solan may refer to:

Peter Solan (Gaelic footballer) (born 1929), Gaelic football corner forward
Peter Solan (director) (1929–2013), Slovak film director